Time in Jordan is on Arabia Standard Time (AST) (UTC+03:00).

Before daylight saving time (DST) was abolished in October 2022, Jordan used EST (UTC+02:00) with an offset of one hour (UTC+03:00) during the summer months. Daylight saving time typically started on Friday during 26 February to 1 April and ended on the last Friday of October, with variations before 2006. In the winter of 2012-2013, there was permanent summer time (UTC+03:00), but had been restored in December 2013, and before 1985, there was permanent standard time (UTC+02:00). In October 2022, daylight saving time was permanently abolished.

References

Jordan